Michael Alden Hadreas (born September 25, 1981), better known by his stage name Perfume Genius, is an American singer, songwriter, and musician. Hadreas's music explores topics including sexuality, his personal struggle with Crohn's disease, domestic abuse, and the dangers faced by gay men in contemporary society.

Early years
Hadreas is of Greek descent and was born in Des Moines, Iowa, moving to the suburbs of Seattle, Washington at age 6 or 7. Hadreas studied painting in school and took piano lessons as a child. His mother was a special education teacher, and is now an assistant principal at a middle school. His parents divorced when he was a teenager.

Growing up, Hadreas was the only openly gay student at his school, and he received death threats that were ignored by the school administration. He dropped out of high school during his senior year. Two years after dropping out, he was attacked by several young men in his neighborhood. He moved to Williamsburg, Brooklyn, and worked as a doorman for a club in the East Village. In 2005, Hadreas returned home to Seattle and began recording music. In 2008, Hadreas set up a MySpace page under the name Perfume Genius, beginning his music career. The moniker comes from the genius perfume-maker in Tom Tykwer's 2006 movie Perfume: The Story of a Murderer.

Career

Early releases

Hadreas's debut album, Learning, was released on June 21, 2010, through Turnstile Records in Europe and Matador Records in the United States. Many of the tracks for Learning were recorded in Hadreas's home. The album quickly received critical acclaim, including an 8.2 out of 10 score from Pitchfork.

He performed his first live show at The Vera Project in Seattle, where he opened for A Sunny Day in Glasgow.  Hadreas brought on pianist, Alan Wyffels, to play for the album tour.  Hadreas would go on to date Wyffels.  Wyffels has continued to perform with Hadreas in recordings and live shows.

Hadreas's second album, Put Your Back N 2 It, was released on February 20, 2012. Again, Hadreas received praise from music critics and fans alike for the sonic intimacy his music achieved.

The promotional video for the album, featuring Hadreas and pornographic actor Arpad Miklos embracing each other, was deemed unsafe for family viewing by YouTube.

Too Bright

On September 23, 2014, Hadreas released his third album, Too Bright, which was co-produced by Adrian Utley of Portishead and Ali Chant, to critical acclaim. The album was a transformative leap for Hadreas and marked a new trajectory in his career. The album received rave reviews from an array of publications. Pitchfork gave the album an 8.5 and commented that "these songs feel less like songs and more like treasures, ones that fill you with power and wisdom."

Following the release of the album, Hadreas toured it and played sold out headline shows. On October 30, 2014, Perfume Genius appeared on The Late Show with David Letterman performing "Queen". In April 2015, Hadreas was featured on the cover and in the pages of Hello Mr.

Hadreas collaborated with Sharon Van Etten to contribute a cover of The Grateful Dead's "To Lay Me Down" to Day of the Dead, a charity tribute album curated and produced by members of The National and released by 4AD on May 20, 2016. All profits from the album are helping to fight HIV/AIDS and related health issues around the world through the Red Hot Organization.

On September 16, 2016, Hadreas released a cover of Elvis' "Can't Help Falling in Love" in collaboration with Prada. The song was featured in the ad campaign for Prada's La Femme and L'Homme fragrances.

No Shape

Hadreas was featured on the cover of the March/April 2017 issue of The Fader, which included a lengthy feature on Hadreas and his work on his next album. In the weeks following the article, Hadreas posted a number of video and audio clips teasing new music. On March 21, 2017, Hadreas announced his fourth studio album No Shape and released the first single "Slip Away", which was accompanied by a music video directed by frequent Björk collaborator Andrew Thomas Huang. The single was designated "Best New Track" by Pitchfork. On April 19, Hadreas released another single from the album called "Go Ahead" during a live Twitter Q&A with fans.

No Shape was released via Matador on May 5, 2017. It was produced by Blake Mills (Fiona Apple, John Legend, Alabama Shakes) and mixed by Grammy Award-winning engineer Shawn Everett. The album was praised by critics. Pitchfork awarded it an 8.8 and named it "Best New Album", deeming it "his most realized album yet, a tender and transcendental protest record of love and devotion." The Guardian commented that "No Shape sounds like a unique talent coming into full bloom."

On May 9, 2017 Perfume Genius released the video for "Die 4 You", directed by Floria Sigismondi. That same month, it was announced that Perfume Genius would curate a part of the line-up for Le Guess Who? Festival in Utrecht in November, for which he invited amongst others Aldous Harding, Mount Eerie, Weyes Blood, and Bulgarian women's choir Le Mystère des Voix Bulgares.

In 2019, the track Otherside was used in the trailer for the film The Goldfinch, adapted from the Donna Tartt novel of the same name.

Set My Heart on Fire Immediately and Ugly Season 
On February 25, 2020, Hadreas released the single, "Describe". On March 16, he released another single, "On the Floor". Both songs were included on his album, Set My Heart on Fire Immediately, released on May 15, 2020.

On June 17, 2022, Hadreas released his sixth studio album, Ugly Season. The album was originally composed as a musical accompaniment for choreographer Kate Wallich's contemporary dance piece The Sun Still Burns Here.

Musical style
Hadreas' musical style has been described as art pop, indie rock, baroque pop, indie pop, chamber pop, folk, pop, and glam rock.

Awards and nominations
{| class=wikitable
|-
! Year !! Awards !! Work !! Category !! Result !! Ref.
|-
| rowspan=2|2014
| rowspan=2|Rober Awards Music Poll
| Himself
| Best Pop Artist 
| 
|-
| rowspan=2|"Queen"
| Best Promo Video
| 
|-
| 2015
| Dorian Awards
| Music Video of the Year 
| 
|-
| rowspan=4|2017
| Music Week Sync Awards
| "I Can't Help Falling in Love"
| Best Sync Online Viral Advert
| 
|-
| Rober Awards Music Poll
| Himself
| Best Songwriter
| 
|-
|Best Art Vinyl
| No Shape
| Best Art Vinyl
| 
|-
| rowspan=3|A2IM Libera Awards
| Toyatathon 2016 Ad Spot
| Best Sync Usage
| 
|-
| rowspan=3|2018
| "Wreath" Video Contest
| Marketing Genius
| 
|-
| "Die 4 You"
| Video of the Year 
| 
|-
| GLAAD Media Awards
| No Shape
| Outstanding Music Artist 
| 
|-
| 2019
| rowspan=2|A2IM Libera Awards
| "Eighth Grade" Trailer
| rowspan=2|Best Sync Usage 
| 
| 
|-
| rowspan=4|2020
| Goldfinch trailer
| 
| 
|-
| rowspan=3|Rober Awards Music Prize
| rowspan=2|Himself
| Best Male Artist
| 
| rowspan=3|
|-
| Songwriter of the Year
| 
|-
| "Describe"
| Best Music Video
| 
|-
| rowspan=8|2021
| rowspan=2|GAFFA Awards
| Himself
| Best International Solo Act
| 
| rowspan=2|
|-
| Set My Heart on Fire Immediately
| Best International Album
| 
|-
|rowspan="5"|Libera Awards
|Record of the Year
|rowspan="3"|Set My Heart on Fire Immediately
|
|rowspan="5"|
|-
|Creative Packaging
|
|-
|Marketing Genius
|
|-
|Best Live Act
|Himself
|
|-
|Video of the Year
|"Describe"
|
|-
| Queerty Awards
| "Jason"
| Anthem
| 
| 
|-
| 2023
| Grammy Awards
| "Spitting Off The Edge Of The World" (with Yeah Yeah Yeahs)
| Best Alternative Music Performance
| 
|

Discography

Learning (2010)
Put Your Back N 2 It (2012)
Too Bright (2014)
No Shape (2017)
Set My Heart on Fire Immediately (2020)
Ugly Season (2022)

References

External links

 Perfume Genius at Matador Records

1981 births
Living people
American male singer-songwriters
American rock singers
American rock songwriters
American people of Greek descent
American gay musicians
LGBT people from Iowa
LGBT people from New York (state)
LGBT people from Washington (state)
Gay singers
Gay songwriters
Matador Records artists
Musicians from Seattle
People from Everett, Washington
Singers from New York City
Chamber pop musicians
Singer-songwriters from Washington (state)
21st-century American male singers
Nettwerk Music Group artists
American LGBT singers
American LGBT songwriters
Art pop musicians
20th-century American LGBT people
21st-century American LGBT people
Singer-songwriters from New York (state)